The Chase Headquarters Building is a building in Waterbury, Connecticut on Grand Street across from the city hall. It is now occupied by the city of Waterbury's offices.

Architecture
The Chase Brass and Copper Company commissioned well-known architect Cass Gilbert to design its corporate headquarters in 1916 across from his recently completed Waterbury city hall. Henry Sabin Chase, the company president, specifically requested that the headquarters be designed to contrast with the style of the city hall, resulting in a design which shunned colonial marble and brick. The Renaissance inspired building relies heavily on Adamesque designs and detailing and evokes the Tower of the Winds in the capitals on the central pavilion's columns. The excellent iron and bronze work for the building was entrusted to Philadelphian Samuel Yellin.

The building is notable for its excellent curved staircase, elaborate Adamesque plaster ceilings, careful detailing, and high quality materials. The stained-glass window in the staircase quotes Abraham Lincoln "Go forward without fear and with manly heart." Interior designer Geoffrey Webster considers the Chase Building to be one of Gilbert's finest works. Construction lasted from 1917 to 1919. The company sold its building in 1963 to preservationists for one dollar, who in turn sold it to the city of Waterbury to be used as city offices, a function it still serves today. It is now known as the Chase Municipal Building and is part of Waterbury's Cass Gilbert Historical District.

Images

References
Cass Gilbert, Life and Work: Architect of the Public Domain eds. Barbara Christen and Steven Flanders, (Norton, 2001) pp. 188–190.

Irish, Sharon (Monacelli, 1999) Cass Gilbert, Architect: Modern Traditionalist, Pg.155-6.

http://www.emporis.com/en/wm/bu/?id=302337

Buildings and structures in Waterbury, Connecticut
Office buildings in Connecticut
Cass Gilbert buildings